Carhoo Upper is a townland within the civil parish of Magourney and catholic parish of Aghabullogue, County Cork, Ireland. It is 199.08 acres in size, and west of Coachford village.

Carhoo firstly appears c. 1590 as 'Carown' in a sketch map The description of Muskery, retained as part of the Dartmouth Map Collection, at the National Maritime Museum, Greenwich. In the Down Survey Maps (1656-8), it is referred to as 'Carrow'  and 'Carrooe', and the accompanying terrier lists Thomas and Edmund Coppinger as proprietors by way of mortgage. The Ordnance Survey name book (c. 1840) describes Carhoo Upper as bounded on the north by Rockgrove townland and on the west by Aghinagh parish. Townland name versions include 'Carhoo' and 'Carhue'. O'Murchú (1991) holds Ceathrú as meaning a quarter, in this instance a measurement of land, such as a townland or ploughland, and being a smaller division than a tuath or triocha céad.  The Placenames Database of Ireland gives the townland an Irish name of An Cheathrú Uachtarach, with Ceathrú meaning a quarterland.

Townlands vary greatly in size, being territorial divisions within parishes in Ireland. Extensively used for land surveys, censuses and polling systems since the seventeenth century, townlands have also been used as the basis for rural postal addresses. In County Cork, surveying and standardisation of townland names and boundaries by the Ordnance Survey during the mid-nineteenth century, resulted in some earlier townland names disappearing, due to amalgamation or division. The townlands resulting from such surveys were employed during the Primary Land Valuation (Griffith's Valuation), subsequent censuses, and continue in use today.

Townland sites/items of interest
Glashagarriff Bridge, Carhue

References

External links
1841/42 surveyed OS maps (maps.osi.ie)
1901 surveyed OS map (maps.osi.ie)
acrheritage.info

Townlands of County Cork